The Karachi Chamber of Commerce and Industry (KCCI) is the Chamber of Commerce for Karachi, Pakistan.

They aim to improve Pakistan's business environment and economic well-being, especially in Karachi. They seek to provide advocacy and opportunity to their thousands of members. KCCI issues statements to the news media, making recommendations and expressing its views over current economic and financial issues in Karachi and Pakistan.

History

The KCCI was formed in 1959 through amalgamation of four existing trade bodies, Pakistan Merchants Association, Buyers and Shippers Chamber, Chamber of Commerce Pakistan, and All Pakistan Chamber of Commerce & Industry. It was officially registered under the Trade Organization Ordinance in 1961.

Composition
The Chamber is affiliated with the Federation of Pakistan Chamber of Commerce & Industry. 

It has two classes of membership: Members, and Town Associations. As of 2019 the Chamber had approximately 17,000 direct members, both industrialists and traders. Seven Industrial Town Associations affiliated with the chamber, S.I.T.E. Association of Industry, Landhi Association of Trade & Industry, Korangi Association of Trade & Industry, Federal 'B' Area Association of Trade & Industry, North Karachi Association of Trade & Industry, S.I.T.E. Superhighway Association of Industry, and Bin Qasim Association of Trade & Industry.

The Chamber's effective membership comes to around 50,000. Due to its location in the commercial, financial and industrial center that is Karachi, it represents mainstream economic activities. Karachi is the largest city in Pakistan. KCCI is the nation's largest business Chamber and is the eighth largest business elective representative body in the world as measured by its membership base.

Management
Policies and programs are determined by the 30 member Managing Committee who are elected by the organization's General Body. Tee Korner Committee members retire every year. Two seats are reserved for Women Entrepreneurs with one seat each for representatives/nominations from affiliated industrial town associations. The President is elected by the General Body and the Senior Vice President and the Vice-President are elected annually by the Managing Committee.The president controls office staff and directs all matters of the Chamber with assistance of the Senior Vice-President and the Vice-President.

Presidents
 M.A. Rangoonwala, 1959 (Chairman Ad'hoc re-organizing Committee for Formation, Chamber of Commerce & Industry, Karachi)
 JP Sheikh Abdul Khaliq Abdul Razak, 1959–1960 (Baba-e-Biradari and founder Jamiyat Punjabi Saudagran-e-Delhi)
 Mohammad Hanif, 1960–1961
 A.K. Sumar, 1961–1963
 M.A. Jawad, 1964–1965
 Mohammad Shafique, 1965–1966
 M.A. Enam Elahi, 1966–1967
 P.G. Allana, 1967–1968
 Yusuf H. Shirazi, 1968–1970
 Ahmed Abdullah, 1970–1971
 Abdur Rehman Haji Habib, 1971–1972
 Kasam Usman Kandawala, 1972–1974
 G.R. Arshad, 1974–1976
 Mohammad Adil, 1976–1978
 Abdul Majeed Suleman Bawany, 1978–1979
 Abdul Jabbar Khamisani, 1978–1979
 Mohammad Muslim, 1979–1980
 Shoukat Ahmed, 1980–1981
 Haji Razak Janoo, 1981–1983
 Jawed Sultan Japanwala, 1983–1984
 Tariq Sayeed, 1984–1985
 Abdul Karim Rajkotwala, 1985–1986
 Aftab Khalili, 1986–1987
 Qaiser Ahmed Sheikh, 1987–1988
 Mohammad Yunus Bandukda, 1988–1989
 Khawaja Qutubuddin, 1989–1990
 Riaz Ahmed Tata, 1990–1991
 Abdul Aziz Haji Yaqoob, 1991–1992
 Tahir Khaliq, 1992–1993
 Haroon Rashid, 1993–1994
 Ahmed A. Sattar, 1994–1995
 Haji Shafiq-ur-Rehman, 1995–1996
 Mian Shahzada Alam, 1996–1997
 Mohammad Hanif Janoo, 1997–1998
 Abdullah Ismail, 1998–1999
 Mamnoon Hussain, 1998–1999
 Javed Muslim, 1998–1999
 Amjad Rafi, 1999–2000
 Muhammad Zubair Motiwala, 2000–2001
 A.Q. Khalil, 2001–2002
 Maqbool A. Shaikh, 2001–2002
 M. Haroon Bari, 2001–2002
 Shaukat Iqbal, 2002–2003
 Mian Nasser Hyatt Maggo, 2002–2003
 Siraj Kassam Teli, 2003–2004
 Khalid Firoz, 2004–2005
 Haroon Farooki, 2005–2006
 Majyd Aziz, 2006–2007
 Shamim Ahmed Shamsi, 2007–2008
 Anjum Nisar, 2008–2010
 Abdul Majid Haji Muhammad, 2009–10
 Muhammad Saeed Shafique,   2010–11
 Mian Abrar Ahmed, 2011–12
 Muhammad Haroon Agar, 2012-2013
 Abdullah Zaki, 2013-2014
 Iftikhar Ahmed Vohra, 2014-2015
 Younus Muhammad Bashir, 2015-2016
 Shamim Ahmed Firpo, 2016-2017
 Muffasar Atta Malik, 2017-2018

Research and development
The Karachi Chamber of Commerce has a Research and Economic Development Department. 

Dr. Syed Mehboob produced several research reports and made the base KCCI's research department. He built a large based DATA BANK at KCCI. The department is headed by Uzma Tasleem. The Research & Development Cell was redefined by Mr. Siraj Kassam Teli during 2012-13.

See also
Federation of Pakistan Chambers of Commerce & Industry
Economy of Karachi
Economy of Pakistan
Karachi

References

External links
Karachi Chamber of Commerce & Industry official website

 Chambers of commerce
 Economy of Karachi
 Chambers of commerce in Pakistan